Erling Øistein Steineide (10 August 1938 – 9 October 2019) was a Norwegian cross-country skier, born in Heidal. He participated at the 1964 Winter Olympics, where he placed fourth in the 4 × 10 km relay event, together with teammates Magnar Lundemo, Einar Østby and Harald Grønningen. He was Norwegian cross-country skiing champion in 15 km in 1965.

Steineide died on 9 October 2019, 81 years old.

Cross-country skiing results

Olympic Games

World Championships

References

External links

1938 births
2019 deaths
People from Sel
Norwegian male cross-country skiers
Olympic cross-country skiers of Norway
Cross-country skiers at the 1964 Winter Olympics
Sportspeople from Innlandet